Lim Jeong-hee (Hangul: 임정희; born May 17, 1981, in Seoul, South Korea), also known as J-Lim, is a South Korean singer that debuted in 2005 under JYP Entertainment. One of her notable performances in 2005 was the 5th Pattaya Music Festival in Thailand, which helped promote and expose her to the foreign music industry. She was signed under Big Hit Music in 2012 and left the company in 2015, going on to join her current agency, Oscar ENT.

Biography
Lim Jeong-hee grew up in a musical environment; her father was an ardent fan of pop music and a collector of music LPs. She was educated in classical music in her childhood and learnt to play the piano. Despite this, as she grew up, she gained more interest in pop music rather than the classical music she had studied.

When she was in high school Lim participated in a song contest for teens held by Seoul City and won the grand prize. The experience of competing in the song contest and winning the top prize led Lim to enter college to study popular music.

Career
She signed with JYP Entertainment. However, Lim was more famous on the street music scene than on television or the radio. Even before she had her official debut, Lim held countless street performances on her own which led to the creation of her multiple fan clubs.

Lim debuted in 2005 with her first album Music is My Life. Through her street performances, Lim said that she has learned so much about music and found an increased love and passion towards music, and that she will continue to hold street performances not only in Seoul but also all around the country.

Her third album, "Before I Go, J-Lim", made headlines for featuring Big Boi from Outkast who also appeared in the music video. On May 8, 2011, she released a music video featuring G.NA, Hyuna and comedian Park Hwi Soon called "Golden Lady". On May 12, 2011, she made her comeback performance on M Countdown with her single 'Golden Lady' On July 2, 2011, she announced that she has been cast as the female lead for the musical "Temptation of Wolves" and will be tackling the challenge of her first musical. From July 12 to October 3, Lim Jeong Hee performed as ‘Jung Hankyung‘, a charming girl who's caught between two different guys for her love. On November 20, 2011, she announced that she will be Brian McKnight's duet partner for his twelfth album JUST ME. She stated, "It's a huge honor to be standing on the same stage as world-renowned R&B legend, Brian McKnight". In 2011, she also appeared on tvN's survival program Opera Star 2011, where she made it to the semi-finals.

Discography

Studio albums

Extended plays

Singles

Soundtrack appearances

Awards and nominations

References 

1981 births
Living people
JYP Entertainment artists
MAMA Award winners
South Korean female idols
People from Seoul
South Korean women pop singers
21st-century South Korean singers
21st-century South Korean women singers